Lance Anderson  is an American makeup artist.

Lance Anderson may also refer to:

Lance Anderson, music producer on Live at the Wolf
Lance Anderson, co-founder of Newsvine
Lance Anderson (American football), American football coach